Zaouiat Ahmed Ben Yaddas is a religious site in the Western Sahara.

Location

Zaouiat Ahmed Ben Yaddas is in Boujdour Province, in the Laâyoune-Sakia El Hamra region.

Religious ceremonies

The site is named after the Maliki leader Ahmed bin Yidas, born in the year 1191 to the Awlad Tadrarine tribe.
The Zaouiat Ahmed Ben Yaddas is considered one of the most ancient and most important zaouiats in the desert region.
The Ahmed bin Yidas Association for Social, Cultural and Educational Development arranges three-day religious ceremonies at Zaouiat Ahmed Ben Yaddas each year, assisted by the tribe of Ouled Tidrarin Fakhda al-Yidadas.

Notes

Sources

Populated places in Western Sahara